Moro Township is located in Madison County, Illinois, in the United States. As of the 2010 census, its population was 3,551 and it contained 1,491 housing units.

Geography

Demographics

References

External links
City-data.com
Illinois State Archives

Townships in Madison County, Illinois
Townships in Illinois